Italy High School is a public high school located in the city of Italy, Texas, in Ellis County, United States and classified as a 2A school by the UIL.  It is a part of the Italy Independent School District located in southwest Ellis County.   In 2013, the school was rated "Met Standard" by the Texas Education Agency.

History
In 2011 Lee Joffre became the principal of Italy High. He became the superintendent of the district in 2016.

On January 22, 2018, 16-year-old male student Chad Padilla shot a fellow student in the cafeteria, wounding 15-year-old female student Mahkayla Jones. The shooter was arrested and initially charged as a juvenile with aggravated assault though the case was eventually moved to adult court and he was sentenced to 40 years on an attempted murder charge and 20 years on each of the aggravated assault indictments. Those sentences will be served concurrently. Padilla was found dead on March 24, 2022 in his cell at Telford Unit in New Boston, Texas of a suspected suicide.

Athletics
The Italy Gladiators compete in these sports 

Volleyball, Cross Country, Football, Basketball, Powerlifting, Golf, Tennis, Track, Baseball & Softball

State Titles
Boys Basketball 
1997(2A)

Notable alumni
Keith Davis - (born December 30, 1978) is a former professional football player for the Dallas Cowboys of the NFL.

References

External links
 

Public high schools in Texas
Schools in Ellis County, Texas